K. communis may refer to:
 Kerria communis, a scale insect species in the genus Kerria
 Knema communis, a plant species found in Malaysia and Singapore

See also
 Communis (disambiguation)